Sulforhodamine B or Kiton Red 620 (C27H30N2O7S2) is a fluorescent dye with uses spanning from laser-induced fluorescence (LIF) to the quantification of cellular proteins of cultured cells.  This red solid dye is very water-soluble.

Spectroscopy
The dye has maximal absorbance at 565 nm light and maximal fluorescence emission at 586 nm light. It does not exhibit pH-dependent absorption or fluorescence over the range of 3 to 10.

Applications
Sulforhodamine B is often used as a membrane-impermeable polar tracer or used for cell density determination via determination of cellular proteins (cytotoxicity assay).

References

Benzenesulfonates
Rhodamine dyes
Xanthenes
Diethylamino compounds